The Senate is the upper house of the Oliy Majlis of the Republic of Uzbekistan.

Composition
The senate is composed of 100 members:
 84 elected senators
 16 senators appointed by the president.

Election
Senators are indirectly elected by an electoral college comprising members of local councils, with the country's 14 regions consisting of 12 provinces plus the capital of Tashkent and the semi-autonomous Republic of Karakalpakstan each electing senators to fill 6 seats. Senators serve 5 year terms.

Chairmen of the Senate of Uzbekistan

References

External links
 

Supreme Assembly (Uzbekistan)
Uzbekistan
2005 establishments in Uzbekistan